Laura Lahtinen (born 3 June 2003) is a Finnish swimmer. She competed in the women's 400 metre freestyle and the women's 200 metre butterfly at the 2019 World Aquatics Championships.

References

External links
 

2003 births
Living people
Finnish female butterfly swimmers
Place of birth missing (living people)
Swimmers at the 2018 Summer Youth Olympics
Finnish female freestyle swimmers
21st-century Finnish women